Hedley Venning Bryant (23 November 1885 – 16 July 1968) was an Australian rules footballer who played with Essendon in the Victorian Football League (VFL).

Notes

External links 

		

1885 births
1968 deaths
Australian rules footballers from Ballarat
Essendon Football Club players
South Ballarat Football Club players
Australian military personnel of World War I
Military personnel from Victoria (Australia)